Kasrawad is a tehsil and  nagar panchayat in Khargone district in the Indian state of Madhya Pradesh.

Geography
It has an average elevation of 169 metres (554 feet) and is 17 km in east from National Highway 3 (Agra to Mumbai) and about 100 km from Indore.The town is 5 km from the northern banks of the holy Narmada River.

History
Kasrawad was an important Buddhist centre during the ancient and medieval periods of the Indian history. Some Buddhist remains and stupas at Kasrawad are considered the 'sites of national importance' by the Archaeological Survey of India. The chalcolithic site of Navdatoli is located 6 kilometers northwest of Kasrawad, on the banks of the Narmada River, opposite Maheshwar. It dates back to the 2nd millennium BCE

Economy
Cotton, soya beans, sugar cane and wheat are the main crops in this area. Kasrawad and the surrounding areas are developing very rapidly. People from surrounding villages come here for their shopping and medical needs.

Culture
Places to visit include the pandhari nath mandir in yadav mohalla, laxmi narayan Temple in kushwaha mohalla, Bhavani Mata Temple, ancient Kailask kund, sai baba mandir, museum, satyadham and Baba ki Mazar on Gangleshwar parvat, Mahalakshmi Mandir, Gayatsri Mata Mandir in Shrinagar colony, Gangore place ( Mata ki Vadi).

Demographics
At the 2001 India census, Kasrawad had a population of 19,035. Males were 51% of the population and females 49%. The average literacy rate was 57%, lower than the national average of 59.5%. Male literacy was 66% and female literacy 48%. 16% of the population were under the age of 6 years.

References

Cities and towns in Khargone district